The 1979 Akron Zips football team represented Akron University in the 1979 NCAA Division II football season as a member of the Mid-Continent Conference. Led by seventh-year head coach Jim Dennison, the Zips played their home games at the Rubber Bowl in Akron, Ohio. They finished the season with a record of 6–5 overall and 3–2 in MCC play, placing third.

Schedule

References

Akron
Akron Zips football seasons
Akron Zips football